Barry Hill may refer to:

 Barry Hill (British writer) (born 1937), British television scriptwriter and dramatist
 Barry Hill (Australian writer) (born 1943), Australian historian, poet, journalist and academic
 Barry Hill (American football) (1953–2010), former American football player
 Barry Hill (Antarctica), an ice-free hill just west of the mouth of LaPrade Valley